Avaneeswaram railway station (Code: AVS) is a railway station in Kollam, Kerala and falls under the Madurai railway division of the Southern Railway zone, Indian Railways. It is a 'D-Class' (NSG 6) Adersh Station.

See also

 Kollam Junction railway station
 Karunagappalli railway station
 Paravur railway station
 Punalur railway station
 Kottarakara railway station

References

Auvaneeswaram
Thiruvananthapuram railway division
1904 establishments in India
Railway stations opened in 1904